Pasquale Esposito (born May 26, 1963) is an Italian actor and film director. His acting style has been shaped by his practice of Zen Buddhism. Esposito gained international recognition for his role in the third season of the Sky Atlantic TV series, Gomorrah (Sky Atlantic). This success led to him being cast in other productions such as Hotel Portofino (PBS), Industry (BBC-HBO), and Ripley (Showtime).

Career 

Esposito began his acting education with different acting teachers from the Actors Studio, New York, such as Francesca De Sapio, Greta Seacat, Susan Batson and Dominique De Fazio, with whom he studied and collaborated with as his personal assistant for many years at the Studio De Fazio.
Esposito completed the 4 level training system of work that Dominique De Fazio initiated in his teaching and went on to teach for 4 years at the Studio De Fazio in Italy, Germany and Los Angeles. In 2008 Esposito directed an award-winning documentary play “Seven” about 7 female protagonists through their journey to freedom, at the Global WIN Conference (Women's International Networking) an independent global women's leadership organization) in Prague.

In 2015 he wrote, produced and directed the documentary In the right light about Kristin Engvig, founder and president of the Win Conference. The documentary was screened in London, Tokyo and Rome and was produced by his company "Art and Awareness".

Esposito is the founder and art director of the Research Company, which researches expression and communication, offers workshops in UK, Germany, Italy and produces his own theatre and film productions. In October 2016, Esposito wrote, directed and performed a theatre play, A looking glass, in Munich at the Lotus Theater, with his company.

Some of the highlights of his acting work include Hidden Children in 2004. Hidden Children is a true story directed by Leone Pompucci about forty Jewish children on their way to Palestine who were blocked by the Germans during the occupation of Yugoslavia in 1941. Pasquale played the supporting role of the Italian captain stopping the train with the children that the Germans Nazi wanted to take in Germany. The TV show won 11 awards.
Esposito also appeared in La squadra – TV Series Rai Fiction, Grundy Italia Production, Center TV Rai Naples Centre Production. He also appeared in When in Rome (2010 film) – director Mark Steven Johnson produced by Touchstone Pictures and distributed by Walt Disney Studio motion pictures and a large part in Gomorrah Third season – produced by Sky Italy. In Gomorrah, which has been described as Italy's most popular TV show based on the best selling book of the same name by journalist Roberto Saviano, Esposito plays a large role.
Esposito has also appeared in the TV series South Wind a Serbian Production (Juzni vetar) written and directed by Milos Avramovic.

Recently, he played a regular role in the British period drama TV Series Hotel Portofino for PBS (ITV - Foxtel - Sky Italy) starring Natasha McElhone. He played a fashion designer millionaire in the BBC production TV series Industry (TV series) second season for HBO and he is also in the drama series "Ripley", based on Patricia Highsmith's bestselling quintet of Tom Ripley novels, for the American Network SHOWTIME. The TV series "Ripley” is directed by the Award-winning Steven Zaillian and starring as Ripley the BAFTA Award-winning Andrew Scott.

Research activities 

Esposito's acting has been influenced and guided by his Zen Buddhism practice. Esposito was officially ordained in 2001 at the Fudenji Zen Temple in Fidenza, Italy. He took the Zaike Tokudo ceremony and got his name (Pasquale Shuten Esposito) from his Zen master Fausto Taiten Guareshi.

Esposito is the founder and president of the cultural association „Flowers in the Sky“, an organisation that supports research and cultivates the education of the Zen tradition and arts; physically, socially and spiritually. Esposito has a passion for inquiry and research about acting in terms of expression and communication, which has steered him in various directions including the Bioenergetic technique, founded by Alexander Lowen (in which he is certified to lead Bioenergetics Exercise Groups/Classes by the I.I.F.A.B (www.iifab.org), the Choice Theory - Reality Therapy a new psychology on the nature of behaviour proposed by Dr William Glasser in which he certified as a facilitator as well as for leading the one-day course "Taking Charge of your life" proposed by William Glasser International.
The Gurdjieff's teaching method that started in Rome which moved to Los Angeles and London and Kundalini yoga which he has practiced for several years alongside Chi kung.

Esposito is also the founder and artistic director of the „Research Company“. The company offers projects and workshops in the UK, Germany and Italy.

Esposito has been invited to the International Symposium on "Mindfulness and Performance" (June 2016) at the University of Huddersfield West Yorkshire, UK, to present “Zen in the Arts; expression and communication". He was also invited to the Symposium organized by Cardiff University (Nov.2016) on “Mindfulness Turn in Martial, Healing, and Performing Arts” to share his work on awareness of the nature of our own expression, an inquiry on our original self.

Private life 

Pasquale Esposito lived in Rome and Los Angeles. Currently he is living in Hamburg, Germany with his wife, Persian-German actress Julia Casper. The couple married 2014 in Africa. He has twins.

Filmography

References

External links 
 Official website
 

Living people
Male actors from Naples
1963 births